Shamokin may refer to the following:

Geographical locations
 Shamokin, Pennsylvania, a city in Northumberland County
 Shamokin Dam, Pennsylvania, a borough in Snyder County
 Shamokin Township, Northumberland County, Pennsylvania
 Shamokin (village), 18th century Native American settlement near the site of present Sunbury
 Great Shamokin Path, a Native American trail
 Shamokin Area School District, a public school district in Northumberland County
 Shamokin Valley Railroad, in Northumberland County
 Shamokin Creek, a tributary of the Susquehanna River

Other
 Shamokin!!!, a 2007 jazz album by Mostly Other People Do the Killing